Stronghold – The Collector's Hit Box is a compilation album by American singer Jennifer Rush.

Released in 2007, the collection was widely anticipated by fans. The album came as a 3 CD box set featuring single releases, remixes and previously unreleased material. Among the rare tracks were four unreleased James Bond themes that Rush had recorded in the early 1980s before her fame. As well as this, the album featured a new remix of her hit "I Come Undone" by Dave Kurtis, which received rave reviews among fans.

Track listing

References

External links

2007 compilation albums
Jennifer Rush albums